The former Breton and French Catholic Diocese of Saint-Malo (then ) existed from at least the 7th century until the French Revolution. Its seat was at Aleth up to some point in the 12th century, when it moved to Saint-Malo. Its territory extended over some of the modern departments of Ille-et-Vilaine, Côtes-d'Armor, and Morbihan. Until the 860s, it was often termed the bishopric of Poutrocoet.

Bishops of Aleth

 Aaron
 Suliac
 Saint Malo or Maclovius 487–565
 Gurval
 Colfin oder Colaphin
 Armael oder Armel
 Enogat
 Maëlmon, ca. 650
 Godefroi or Geofroi c. 656
 Oedmal
 Hamon I.
 Noedi
 Ritwal
 Tutamen
 Ravili
 Bili I.
 Meen or Moene
 Ebon or Edon
 Guibon or Guibert
 Hamon II.
 Walter
 Cadocanan
 Rivallon I.
 Judicaël I. 
 Réginald or Regimond
 Menfenic
 Budic or Benedikt
 Docmaël or Idomaël
 Johannes
 Walter
 Hélogard or Haelocar 811–816
 Ermorus or Ermor 833–834
 Iarnwaltus or Jarnuvalt 835–837
 Main, Maen or Mahen 840–846
 Salocon c. 848
 Rethwalatrus or Retuvalart 857–867
 Ratvomo or Ratwili 867–872
 Bili II. ca. 880
 Salvator (tenth century)
 Rouaud oder Raoul um 990
Vakanz 999–1028
 Hamon III. c. 1028
 Martin c. 1054
Vakanz 1054–1062
 Renaud or Rainaud c. 1062
Vakanz 1062–1085
 Daniel I. c. 1085
 Benedict (II.)
 Judicaël II. 1089–1111
 Rivallon II. 1112–1118
 Daniel II. c. 1120
 Donoald 1120–1143

Bishops of Saint-Malo

1146–1400

 Jean de Châtillon 1146–1163
 Albert or Aubert 1163–1184
 Pierre Giraud or Géraud 1184–1218
 Raoul or Rudolf 1219–1230
 Geoffroi de Pontual 1231–1255
 Nicolas de Flac 1254–1262
 Phillipe de Bouchalampe 1263
 Simon de Cliçon or Clisson 1264–1286
 Robert du Pont 1287–1309
 Raoul Rousselet 1310–1317
 Alain Gonthier 1318–1333
 Yves le Prévôt de Bois Boëssel 1333–1348
 Guillaume Mahé 1348–1349
 Pierre Benoît or de Guémené 1349–1359
 Guillaume Poulart 1359–1374
 Josselin de Rohan 1375–1389
 Robert de la Motte d'Acigné 1389–1423

1423–1827

 Guillaume de Montfort 1423–1432
 Amaury de la Motte d'Acigné 1432–1434
 Pierre Piédru 1434–1449
 Jacques d'Espinay-Durestal 1450
 Jean L'Espervier 1450–1486
 Pierre de Montfort de Laval 1486–1493
 Guillaume Briçonnet 1493–1513
 Denis Briçonnet 1513–1535
 François Bohier 1535–1569
 Guillaume Ruzé 1570–1572
 François Thomé 1573–1586
 Charles de Bourgneuf 1586–1596
 Jean du Bec 1598–1610
 Guillaume le Gouverneur 1610–1630
 Octavien de Marillac Michel de Paris 1630
 Achille de Harlay de Sancy 1631–1644
 Ferdinand de Neufville 1644–1657
 François de Villemontée 1658–1670
 Sébastien de Guémadeuc 1671–1702
 Vincent-François des Maretz 1702–1739
 Jean-Joseph de Fogasses 1739–1767
 Antoine-Joseph des Laurents 1767–1785
 Gabriel Cortois de Pressigny 1785–1790
 Siméon L'Archant de Grimouville 1817

See also
Catholic Church in France
List of Catholic dioceses in France

References

Sources
 pp. 548–549. (Use with caution; obsolete)
  p. 301. (in Latin)
 p. 175.

 p. 219.
 

 
Saint-Malo
Dioceses established in the 7th century
7th-century establishments in Francia